Tubo, officially the Municipality of Tubo, is a 4th class municipality in the province of Abra, Philippines. According to the 2020 census, it has a population of 5,674 people.

The municipality was created on June 17, 1967, from the former municipal district of the same name, through Republic Act 5161.

History

The inhabitants belong to the Maeng tribe and speak the dialect of the same name. There is however one barangay, Tabacda, that speaks a different dialect. This is because they are believed to have originated from Kalinga and Mountain Province. Everyone can however understand and speak the common evolving dialect called Maeng together with those of Luba and parts of Villavicioa of the Province of Abra and likewise in the other municipalities of the Province of Ilocos Sur, who refer themselves as the Bago tribe.

Agriculture is the main source of livelihood but various industries are starting to grow.

All barangays and their respective sitios do now have dirt roads leading to them but can still become accessible via trails permanently established even during the Spanish era. Electricity is available except in only one barangay and two sitios. The relative nearness of the three barangays of Dilong,Tubtuba and Alangtin to the Province of Ilocos Sur provided them the privilege of being served by ISECO while all others remaining are served by ABRECO.

Geography

According to the Philippine Statistics Authority, the municipality has a land area of  constituting  of the  total area of Abra.

The town is bounded on the west by Ilocos Sur and Luba, Abra, north by Boliney, east by Kalinga and Mountain Province, and south by Mountain Province and Ilocos Sur.

Tubo can be reached through various routes. Coming from Bangued, the place can be reached by passing through the towns of Peñarrubia-Bucay-Manabo and Luba. It could also be reached via Candon-San Emilio and Tagudin-Quirino of the nearby province of Ilocos Sur, or via Besao of Mountain Province or Kalinga. Unfortunately, no road links exist herein.

Barangays
Tubo is politically subdivided into 10 barangays. These barangays are headed by elected officials: Barangay Captain, Barangay Council, whose members are called Barangay Councilors. All are elected every three years.

The 10 barangays are grouped into three (3) zones:
 Zone 1: Poblacion (Mayabo), Wayangan and Supo
 Zone 2: Tiempo, Kili, Tabacda and Amtuagan 
 Zone 3: Alangtin-Batayan, Tubtuba and Dilong

Climate

Demographics

In the 2020 census, Tubo had a population of 5,674.

Economy

Government
Tubo, belonging to the lone congressional district of the province of Abra, is governed by a mayor designated as its local chief executive and by a municipal council as its legislative body in accordance with the Local Government Code. The mayor, vice mayor, and the councilors are elected directly by the people through an election which is being held every three years.

Elected officials

References

External links

 [ Philippine Standard Geographic Code]
 Municipality of Tubo

Municipalities of Abra (province)
Populated places on the Abra River